Valentim de Carvalho is a Portuguese record label founded in 1914.

History

The company started selling phonograph, musical instruments and music since its 1914 foundation at the Rua da Assunção, Lisbon.

It distributes EMI in Portugal since 1920. VDC also carved names in the Portuguese music industry like Amália Rodrigues, António Variações and, most recently, Os Pontos Negros. It has two sub-labels: Popular and NorteSul. In 1994, the company was merged with EMI to form EMI-Valentim de Carvalho and also distributed UMG Portugal. It became EMI Music Portugal in 2006 and in 2013, the record label became a part of Parlophone and its Portuguese EMI catalogue are now under Warner Music Group.

As of 2014, JRP Group owns VdC. VdC now sells books aside from CDs and DVDs.

Labels distributed
EMI
UMG Portugal
Disney Music Group
RCA Records
Som Livre
Zomba Group of Companies
HMV
Decca Records

References

External links
 Official Site 

Portuguese record labels
Record labels established in 1914
IFPI members